The 1997–98 Heineken Cup pool stage took place in September and October 1997. The winner of each pool advanced to the quarter-finals, with the runners-up and best third placed team entering the quarter-final play-offs for the final three quarter final places.

Pool 1

Pool 2

Pool 3

Pool 4

Pool 5

See also
1997-98 Heineken Cup

External links

Pool Stage
Heineken Cup pool stages

References